New York Public Radio (NYPR) is the owner of WNYC (AM), WNYC-FM, WNYC Studios, WQXR-FM, New Jersey Public Radio, and the Jerome L. Greene Performance Space. Combined, New York Public Radio owns WNYC (AM), WNYC-FM, WQXR-FM, WQXW, WNJT-FM, WNJP, WNJY, and WNJO.

New York Public Radio is a not-for-profit corporation, incorporated in 1979, and is a publicly supported organization.

The NYPR stations broadcast from studios and offices at 160 Varick Street in the Hudson Square area of Manhattan.  WNYC's AM transmitter is located in Kearny, New Jersey; WNYC-FM and WQXR-FM's transmitters are located at the Empire State Building in New York City.

The four New Jersey Radio stations are collectively referred to as New Jersey Public Radio. They are a group of four northern New Jersey noncommercial FM stations acquired by New York Public Radio from the New Jersey Public Broadcasting Authority on July 1, 2011.

New Jersey Public Radio news content comes from the WNYC newsroom as well as from a growing network of partners in the New Jersey News Service.

History

Independence from the City

Shortly after assuming the mayoralty in 1994, Rudolph W. Giuliani announced he was considering selling the WNYC stations. Giuliani believed that broadcasting was no longer essential as a municipal service, and that the financial compensation from selling the stations could be used to help the City cover budget shortfalls.  The final decision was made in March 1995: while the City opted to divest WNYC-TV (now WPXN-TV) through a blind auction to commercial buyers, WNYC-AM-FM was sold to the WNYC Foundation for $20 million over a six-year period, far less than what the stations could have been sold for if they were placed on the open market.  While the sale put an end to the occasional political intrusions of the past, it required the WNYC Foundation to embark on a major appeal towards listeners, other foundations, and private benefactors. The station's audience and budget have continued to grow since the split from the City.

The terrorist attacks of September 11, 2001 destroyed WNYC-FM's transmitter atop the World Trade Center. WNYC-AM-FM's studios, in the nearby Manhattan Municipal Building, had to be evacuated and station staff was unable to return to its offices for three weeks. The FM signal was knocked off the air for a time. WNYC temporarily moved to studios at National Public Radio's New York bureau in midtown Manhattan, where it broadcast on its still operating AM signal transmitting from towers in Kearny, New Jersey and by a live Internet stream. The stations eventually returned to the Municipal Building.

Move to new studios
On June 16, 2008 NYPR moved from its  of rent-free space scattered on eight floors of the Manhattan Municipal Building to a new location at 160 Varick Street, near the Holland Tunnel. The station now occupies three and a half floors of a 12-story former printing building. The number of recording studios and booths has doubled, to 31. There is a new 140-seat, street-level studio for live broadcasts, concerts and public forums and an expansion of the newsroom of over 60 journalists. Renovation, construction, rent and operating costs for the new Varick Street location amounted to $45 million. In addition to raising these funds, NYPR raised money for a one-time fund of $12.5 million to cover the cost of creating 40 more hours of new programming and three new shows. The total cost of $57.5 million for both the move and programming is nearly three times the $20 million the station had to raise over seven years to buy its licenses from the City in 1997.

Acquisition of WQXR-FM
On October 8, 2009 NYPR took control of classical music station WQXR-FM, then at 96.3 FM.  WQXR-FM's intellectual property (call letters and format) was acquired from the New York Times Company as part of a three-way transaction with Univision Radio.  WNYC also purchased the 105.9 FM frequency of Univision's WCAA (now WXNY-FM).  WQXR-FM's classical format moved to 105.9 and WXNY's Spanish Tropical format debuted at 96.3.  The deal resulted in WQXR-FM becoming a non-commercial station.  With WQXR as a co-owned 24-hour classical station, WNYC-FM dropped its remaining classical music programming to become a full-time news/talk station.

New Jersey expansion

On June 6, 2011, the New Jersey Public Broadcasting Authority agreed to sell four FM stations in northern New Jersey to New York Public Radio.  The transaction was announced by Governor Chris Christie, as part of his long-term goal to end State-subsidized public broadcasting.  The four stations were previously the northern half of New Jersey Network's statewide radio service, with the stations in southern New Jersey going to Philadelphia public radio station WHYY-FM.  Upon taking control of the four stations on July 1, 2011, they were rebranded as New Jersey Public Radio.

Programming

NYPR produces 100 hours a week of its own programming, including nationally syndicated shows such as On the Media, The New Yorker Radio Hour and Radiolab, as well as local news and interview shows that include The Brian Lehrer Show and All of It with Alison Stewart. The entire schedule is streamed live over the internet on wnyc.org.

NYPR's WNYC-AM-FM has a local news team of approximately 60 journalists, producers, and other broadcasting professionals.

On the Media is a nationally syndicated, weekly one-hour program hosted by Brooke Gladstone and Bob Garfield, formerly of Advertising Age, covering the media and its effect on American culture and society. Many stories investigate how events of the past week were covered by the press. Stories also regularly cover such topics as video news releases, net neutrality, media consolidation, censorship, freedom of the press, spin, and how the media is changing with technology. It won a Peabody Award in 2004.

The Brian Lehrer Show is a two-hour weekday talk show covering local and national current events and social issues hosted by Brian Lehrer, a former anchor and reporter for NBC Radio Network. It won a Peabody Award in 2007 "for facilitating reasoned conversation about critical issues and opening it up to everyone within earshot."

Other locally produced programs include:
New Sounds: Since 1982, founder and host John Schaefer has devoted the program to present new and eclectic music. The New York Times hailed the program as “a genre-defying radio program that has played an outsize role in [New York City’s] new music scene for nearly four decades.” In early 2018, the 24-hour streaming music site NewSounds.org was launched.
Radiolab:  each episode is a patchwork of people, sounds, stories and experiences centered around one idea.
Radio Rookies:  provides teenagers with the tools and training to create radio stories about themselves, their communities and their world. It won a Peabody Award in 2005.
Selected Shorts: actors read contemporary and classic short fiction before a live audience.  Works range from Chekhov, Maupassant, Malamud, and Singer, to Jhumpa Lahiri and Jonathan Franzen.
Spinning On Air: specializes in unusual, uncategorizeable music, with an emphasis on in-studio performances.
The Takeaway: a weekday one-hour show, hosted by Tanzina Vega, co-produced with Public Radio Exchange.
Death, Sex & Money: Anna Sale talks to celebrities and regular people about relationships, money, family, work and making it all count.

Financing 

NYPR includes WNYC Radio, WQXR, and New Jersey Public Radio.

NYPR reported a total revenue of $68,038,410 for the tax year ending June 30, 2015, in their last IRS Form 990 Income Tax Statement filing.

Leadership 
In 2019, journalist Goli Sheikholeslami was named as CEO of NY Public Radio. She succeeded Laura R. Walker, who had led the organization since 1995. Under Walker's leadership, WNYC AM and FM grew from a monthly audience of 1 million and a budget of $8 million with $11.8 million in annual fund-raising to a monthly audience of 26 million and an annual budget of $100 million with $52 million in annual fund-raising.

Sheikholeslami became CEO of Politico and was succeeded in 2022 by Cynthia King Vance.

In 2021, attorney Timothy A. Wilkins was named as chairman of the board of trustees. As of 2018, the organization had 37 trustees.

Listenership and new media
NYPR has been an early adopter of new technologies including HD radio, live audio streaming, and podcasting. RSS feeds and email newsletters link to archived audio of individual program segments. WNYC also makes some of its programming available on Sirius XM satellite radio.

See also 
WPXN-TV (channel 31, formerly WNYC-TV)
Media in New York City
New Jersey Public Radio

References

External links
 
 WNYC historical profile (1978) at NY Radio News
 

 
Peabody Award winners
HD Radio stations
NPR member networks
1967 establishments in New York City